Wily Peralta (born May 8, 1989) is a Dominican professional baseball pitcher in the Washington Nationals organization. He has previously played in Major League Baseball (MLB) for the Milwaukee Brewers, Kansas City Royals and Detroit Tigers.

Early life
Peralta grew up in Samana, Dominican Republic, but moved to Santo Domingo when he was 11 in order to train with his uncle. He did not own a baseball glove until he was 11 years old. He practiced his throwing with a lemon.

Career

Milwaukee Brewers

Minor League Baseball

Peralta was signed by the Brewers as a free agent in 2006. He played his first professional season in America for the rookie-level Arizona League Brewers that season. After sitting out the 2007 season, he returned in 2008, playing for the rookie-league Helena Brewers and Class A West Virginia Power. Peralta played for the Class A Wisconsin Timber Rattlers in 2009. He split the 2010 season between the Class A-Advanced Brevard County Manatees and Double-A Huntsville Stars. He was added to the Brewers' 40-man roster following the season.

Peralta began the 2011 season with Huntsville. He was promoted to the Triple-A Nashville Sounds late in the season.

Major League Baseball
The Brewers promoted Peralta to the MLB roster on April 21, 2012, to replace Kameron Loe. Peralta started his first MLB game on September 5, 2012, against the Miami Marlins. On July 9, 2013, Peralta pitched his first MLB career complete game against the Cincinnati Reds, the first complete game pitched by a Brewers pitcher since April 5, 2011 by Yovani Gallardo.

In 2013, Peralta opened the season in the Brewers rotation. For the season, Peralta went 11–15 with a 4.37 ERA and 2 complete games. Peralta had his career season in 2014, winning 17 games and sporting a career low 3.53 ERA in 32 starts. The following season was an unhealthy season for Peralta, as he had an extended DL stint, only managing 20 starts. In 2016, Peralta battled with inconsistency and injuries for a second straight season, as he finished 7–11 with a 4.86 ERA in 23 starts.

After a rough start to the 2017 season, Peralta was shifted to the bullpen. He was designated for assignment on July 28. For the season, Peralta appeared in 19 games, 8 starts with an ERA of 7.85 for Milwaukee.

Kansas City Royals
On December 5, 2017, Peralta signed a one-year, $1.5 million contract with the Kansas City Royals. His contract included a $3 million club option for the 2019 season. Peralta was designated for assignment on March 28, 2018. He cleared waivers and was outrighted to the Class AAA Omaha Storm Chasers. He was recalled by the Royals on June 17. During the month of June, he made five appearances in relief, allowing one run in  innings pitched and recording two saves. On the season, Peralta pitched exclusively out of the bullpen, recording 14 saves in 37 appearances.

Through July 19, 2019, Peralta appeared in 42 games, posting an ERA of 5.80 with 2 saves. On July 20, 2019, Peralta was designated for assignment. On July 24, 2019, Peralta was released from the Royals after clearing waivers.

Detroit Tigers
On February 18, 2021, after spending the 2020 season as a free agent, Peralta signed a minor league contract with the Detroit Tigers organization and received an invitation to Spring Training. He was assigned to the Triple-A Toledo Mud Hens to begin the year, and recorded a 2.75 ERA in 6 appearances. On June 15, Peralta was selected to the active roster. On June 30, Peralta recorded his first win as a starter since 2017, allowing one run (zero earned) and three hits over five innings in a victory over the Cleveland Indians. Peralta made 18 starts for the 2021 Tigers, posting a 4–5 record with a 3.07 ERA.

On March 16, 2022, Peralta was signed to another minor league contract with an invitation to spring training. On April 16, the Tigers selected Peralta's contract. He made 28 appearances for the team, recording a 2-0 record and 2.58 ERA with 32 strikeouts in 38.1 innings pitched. On August 19, 2022, the Tigers designated Peralta for assignment. He was released on August 22, 2022.

Washington Nationals
On January 31, 2023, Peralta signed a minor league contract with the Washington Nationals organization.

References

External links

1989 births
Living people
Arizona League Brewers players
Brevard County Manatees players
Detroit Tigers players
Dominican Republic expatriate baseball players in the United States
Gigantes del Cibao players
Helena Brewers players
Huntsville Stars players
Kansas City Royals players
Major League Baseball pitchers
Major League Baseball players from the Dominican Republic
Milwaukee Brewers players
Nashville Sounds players
Omaha Storm Chasers players
Toledo Mud Hens players
West Virginia Power players
Wisconsin Timber Rattlers players
World Baseball Classic players of the Dominican Republic
2017 World Baseball Classic players
People from Samaná Province